The Măria (in its upper course: Măria Mare) is a left tributary of the Someșul Mare in Romania. It discharges into the Someșul Mare near Valea Mare.

References

Rivers of Romania
Rivers of Bistrița-Năsăud County